The 2021 WNBA All-Star Game was an exhibition basketball game played on July 14, 2021. The Las Vegas Aces hosted the WNBA All-Star Game for the second time. This game was the first since 2000 to be held in the same year as the Summer Olympic Games, as the WNBA did not hold All-Star Games in four previous Summer Olympic years.

Rosters

Selection
On June 16, the WNBA announced that 2021 would have a similar roster selection process to the 2018 and 2019 All-Star games. Fans, WNBA players, head coaches, sports writers, and broadcasters would all be able to vote for All Stars. All groups could fill out a ballot of four guards and six front court players. Players and coaches could not vote for members of their own team. Voting began on June 15 at 2 p.m. EDT and ended on June 27 at 11:59 p.m. EDT.  There were two days where fans could have their votes count twice, June 20 and June 27.

The voting was weighted as follows: 

Players were not allowed to vote for their own teammates. The top 36 vote-getters would be selected as All-Stars.  There will be a minimum of 9 backcourt players and 15 frontcourt players selected.  Of these 36, WNBA Head Coaches will select 12 players to make up Team WNBA All-Stars.  These twelve players will compete against members of the US Olympic Team.  The WNBA All-Star roster was announced on June 30, 2021.

All-Star Pool 
The players for the All-Star Game were selected by the voting process described above.  Rosters were released on June 30, 2021.

All-Star Selections per team

Final rosters

Starters will be announced by the respective head coaches of the USA Basketball Women's National Team and Team WNBA.

Game

Three-Point Contest
On July 9, 2021, it was announced that a Three-Point Contest will be held during half time of the All-Star game.  It was also announced that the Skills Challenge held in 2019 would not be held this year.

Rules
The Three-Point Shootout is a two-round, timed competition in which five shooting locations are positioned around the three-point arc. Four racks contain four WNBA balls (each worth one point) and one “money” ball (worth two points). The fifth station is a special “all money ball” rack, which each participant can place at any of the five locations. Every ball on this rack is worth two points. Two balls were placed on pedestals between racks 2 and 3 and racks 3 and 4.  Each of these balls is worth three points. The players have one minute and ten seconds to shoot as many of the 27 balls as they can. The two competitors with the highest scores in the first round advance to the championship round.

Results

References

WNBA All-Star Game
Women's National Basketball Association All-Star Game
WNBA All-Star Game